The 2019 LTP Charleston Pro Tennis II was a professional tennis tournament played on outdoor clay courts. It was the fifth edition of the tournament which was part of the 2019 ITF Women's World Tennis Tour. It took place in Charleston, South Carolina, United States between 30 September and 6 October 2019.

Singles main-draw entrants

Seeds

 1 Rankings are as of 23 September 2019.

Other entrants
The following players received wildcards into the singles main draw:
  Reese Brantmeier
  Elizabeth Mandlik
  Karina Miller
  Emma Navarro

The following players received entry from the qualifying draw:
  Bárbara Gatica
  Alexa Glatch
  Ashley Kratzer
  Suzan Lamens
  Tara Moore
  Marine Partaud
  Shalimar Talbi
  Olivia Tjandramulia

The following players received entry as a lucky loser:
  Maria Mateas

Champions

Singles

 Caroline Dolehide def.  Grace Min, 6–2, 6–7(5–7), 6–0

Doubles

 Anna Danilina /  Ingrid Neel def.  Vladica Babić /  Caitlin Whoriskey, 6–1, 6–1

References

External links
 2019 LTP Charleston Pro Tennis II at ITFtennis.com
 Official website

2019 ITF Women's World Tennis Tour
2019 in American tennis
September 2019 sports events in the United States
October 2019 sports events in the United States
LTP Charleston Pro Tennis
2019 in sports in South Carolina